Daggers is the second studio album by British industrial metal band The Defiled, released in Europe on 2 August 2013, in the UK on 5 August, and in the US on 6 August. The album is their first to be released on Nuclear Blast, and first fan-funded album, funded through summer 2012 on PledgeMusic, as well as the debut of drummer Needles. The album was recorded throughout summer 2012 with producer Jason Suecof in Florida. The first single, "Sleeper", was released by the band on 17 March 2013. The second single, "Unspoken", was released along with a music video on 4 June, which was directed by Robin Fuller who also directed the video for the band's first ever single, 'The Resurrectionists'.

Track listing

Personnel

The Defiled
Stitch D – vocals, guitars
The A.v.D – programming, synthesizer, keyboards, backing vocals
Aaron Curse – guitar
Vincent Hyde – bass guitar
Needles – drums

Production
Jason Suecof – production, mixing
Eyal Levi - mixing, editing
Scott Chalmers - artwork, photography
Adam Da Rat - additional vocals on Infected
Terry Bezer - additional vocals on Infected

References

2013 albums
The Defiled albums
Nuclear Blast albums
Albums produced by Jason Suecof